Yep or YEP may refer to:

 A form of yes, an affirmative particle in the English language; see yes and no
 Yep (software), a document management tool for Macs
 "Yep!", a 1959 Duane Eddy song
 Yorkshire Evening Post, a newspaper in England

People
 Laurence Yep (born 1948), Chinese–American writer of children's books
 Yep Kramer (born 1957), Dutch–Frisian speed skater